Phasia is a genus of flies in the family Tachinidae.

Species
P. aeneoventris (Williston, 1886)
P. africana Sun, 2003
P. albipennis (Brooks, 1945)
P. albopunctata (Baranov, 1935)
P. aldrichii (Townsend, 1891)
P. argentifrons Walker, 1894
P. aurigera (Egger, 1860)
P. aurulans Meigen, 1824
P. australiensis Sun, 2003
P. barbifrons (Girschner, 1887)
P. bifurca Sun, 2003
P. brachyptera Sun, 2003
P. campbelli (Miller, 1923)
P. cana Sun, 2003
P. caudata (Villeneuve, 1932)
P. chilensis (Macquart, 1851)
P. clavigralla Sun, 2003
P. cylindrata Sun, 2003
P. distincta Sun, 2003
P. diversa (Coquillett, 1897)
P. emdeni (Draber-Monko, 1970)
P. faceta Sun, 2003
P. fenestrata (Bigot, 1889)
P. frontata Sun, 2003
P. furcata Sun, 2003
P. girschneri (Draber-Monko, 1965)
P. godfreyi (Draber-Monko, 1964)
P. grandis (Coquillett, 1897)
P. grazynae (Draber-Monko, 1965)
P. hemiptera (Fabricius, 1794)
P. hippobosca (Paramonov, 1958)
P. indica (Mesnil, 1953)
P. japanensis Sun, 2003
P. jeanneli (Mesnil, 1953)
P. karczewskii (Draber-Monko, 1965)
P. kudoi Sun, 2003
P. latifrons (Paramonov, 1958)
P. lauta Sun, 2003
P. lepidofera (Malloch, 1929)
P. malaisei Sun, 2003
P. malayana Sun, 2003
P. mathisi Sun, 2003
P. mesnili (Draber-Monko, 1965)
P. minima Sun, 2003
P. multisetosa (Villeneuve, 1923)
P. nasalis (Bezzi, 1908)
P. nasuta (Loew, 1852)
P. nigrens (Wulp, 1892)
P. nigrofimbriata (Villeneuve, 1935)
P. nigromaculata Sun, 2003
P. normalis (Curran, 1927)
P. noskiewiczi (Draber-Monko, 1965)
P. obesa (Fabricius, 1798)
P. pandellei (Dupuis, 1957)
P. piceipes (Wulp, 1892)
P. punctigera (Townsend, 1891)
P. purpurascens (Townsend, 1891)
P. pusilla Meigen, 1824
P. robertsonii (Townsend, 1891)
P. robusta (Brooks, 1945)
P. rohdendorfi (Draber-Monko, 1965)
P. rotundata Sun, 2003
P. rufiventris (Macquart, 1851)
P. sensua (Curran, 1927)
P. serrata Sun, 2003
P. siberica Sun, 2003
P. sichuanensis Sun, 2003
P. singuliseta Sun, 2003
P. subcoleoptrata (Linnaeus, 1767)
P. subnitida Sun, 2003
P. subopaca (Coquillett, 1897)
P. sumatrana Sun, 2003
P. takanoi (Draber-Monko, 1965)
P. tibialis (Villeneuve, 1932)
P. transvaalensis Sun, 2003
P. triangulata Sun, 2003
P. truncata Herting, 1983
P. varicolor (Curran, 1927)
P. venturii (Draber-Monko, 1965)
P. wangi Sun, 2003
P. woodi Sun, 2003
P. zimini (Draber-Monko, 1965)

References

Phasiinae
Diptera of Asia
Diptera of Europe
Diptera of Africa
Diptera of North America
Diptera of South America
Diptera of Australasia
Tachinidae genera
Taxa named by Jean-Baptiste Robineau-Desvoidy